Schapelle can refer to:

Schapelle Corby, an Australian woman convicted of drug smuggling in Indonesia
Schapelle (film), a television film about convicted drug smuggler Schapelle Corby
Ganja Queen, a documentary about Schapelle Corby also subtitled Schapelle Corby: The Hidden Truth